Raines Corner may refer to:

 Raines Corner, Virginia, U.S., an unincorporated community
 Raines Corner, West Virginia, U.S., an unincorporated community